Tiger Town is a 1983 American made-for-television sports drama film and is the first television film produced for the Disney Channel. It was awarded a CableACE Award in 1984 for Best Dramatic Film. The film stars Roy Scheider as Billy Young, an aging baseball player for the Detroit Tigers, and Justin Henry as Alex, a young fan who believes in him. Tiger Town originally aired October 9, 1983 on the Disney Channel.

The film was written and directed by Detroit native Alan Shapiro and executive produced by Susan B. Landau. It was subsequently aired on ABC's Disney Sunday Movie, and had a limited theatrical release in the Detroit area in June 1984, which (coincidentally) was during Tigers’ best season in franchise history.

Most of the film was shot on location at Tiger Stadium and in the city of Detroit. One notable goof in the film shows Alex racing his bicycle across a bridge over the Detroit River on the way to the stadium. The bridge is the one leading from the Detroit mainland to Belle Isle Park, an island park where there is no residential area.

Plot description
Alex (Henry) and his father (Ron McLarty) are devoted Detroit Tigers fans, even now as they are struggling. Alex's favorite player is aging star Billy Young (Scheider), who is having a sub-par season, which is also his last. His only remaining wish is to play in the World Series before retiring.

Alex's father dies unexpectedly, but not before he tells Alex that he should always believe. Consequently, Alex decides to visit every Tiger home game. Every time Young comes to the plate, Alex closes his eyes and wishes hard, and Young ends up hitting a home run. Thanks to Young's rejuvenated play, the Tigers start winning again.

But there is a price. Alex, who now believes that if he doesn't go to the games, the team will lose (explaining the Tigers' pitiful road trips); finds himself the subject of ridicule by classmates, since he often sneaks out of school early to watch the Tigers play. Nevertheless, thanks to Billy Young, the Tigers claw their way back into the pennant race. The final game of the season, against the Baltimore Orioles, would decide the pennant.

Alex has his ticket and school lets out early so kids can watch the game, but as Alex leaves school, he is detained by a gang of bullies who take his ticket and his money. Only when Alex gets his principal's attention is he released and forced to run all the way to Tiger Stadium. Bribing a little girl for her bike and hanging onto the back of a city bus gets Alex to the stadium in time for the ninth inning, where Young is up and the Tigers are trailing. Young makes contact with the ball just as Alex gets to the front of the stadium aisle, and Young ends up clearing the bases, giving the Tigers the American League East title and securing a chance to play in the American League Championship Series, thus one step closer to Young's wish to play in the World Series.

In real life, the Tigers would win the World Series the very next year (1984).

Cameos
Several Detroit broadcasters and celebrities appear as themselves in the movie. Tigers manager Sparky Anderson appears frequently in the movie. Mary Wilson, a former Supreme, sings the national anthem before the final game. Also appearing are Ernie Harwell, the legendary play-by-play radio voice of the Tigers; Detroit sportscaster Ray Lane, as Ernie's partner; and then-WDIV sportscaster Al Ackerman — who would help coin the rally cry “Bless You Boys” for the 1984 season.

Harwell and Lane were paired in the radio booth calling games on WJR radio from 1967 to 1972.

Ackerman was a sports anchor for Detroit's WXYZ-TV and WDIV-TV in the 1970s and 1980s.

References

External links
 
 Tiger Town from iReport.com

1983 films
1983 television films
1980s sports drama films
American baseball films
American sports drama films
CableACE Award winners
Detroit Tigers
Disney Channel original films
Films set in Detroit
Films shot in Detroit
1983 drama films
1980s American films
1980s English-language films